Test Drive Unlimited Solar Crown is an upcoming open world racing video game developed by KT Racing and published by Nacon. It will be the twenty-first game in the Test Drive series, the first title in the series since 2012's Ferrari Racing Legends, and the third game in the franchise's Unlimited reboot, following 2011's Test Drive Unlimited 2. The game was teased on 3 July 2020 on Twitter and was officially revealed during the Nacon Connect event on 7 July. Test Drive Unlimited Solar Crown is set to be released for Microsoft Windows, Nintendo Switch, PlayStation 5, and Xbox Series X/S in 2023.

Development and marketing
It was reported in December 2016 that French publisher Bigben Interactive (now called Nacon) acquired the Test Drive intellectual property from Atari, with plans to reboot the franchise. In 2018, Bigben announced the acquisition of French game developer Kylotonn, with Roman Vincent, president of Kylotonn suggesting they were working on the next installment of Test Drive.
In April 2020, Nacon filed a trade mark to the Intellectual Property Office for Test Drive Solar Crown, the last two words referring to the Solar Crown in-universe racing competition series featured in 2011's Test Drive Unlimited 2.

On 3 July 2020, the official Test Drive Twitter account tweeted a twelve-second video clip of a crown-shaped logo with the letters "SC" in it forming, announcing a full reveal during the Nacon Connect video event on 7 July. The game was officially announced on that date during the event with a 25-second teaser trailer, with Kylotonn (under their KT Racing brand) developing. Based on copyright text at the end of the video, the game will feature vehicles from (among others to be announced) Bugatti, Dodge, Ferrari, Koenigsegg, Lamborghini, and Porsche.

The game will feature a 1:1 recreation of Hong Kong Island as revealed in a trailer released on 6 July 2021 during Nacon Connect 2021. The game will have "a realistic driving experience", indicating that the game will have a realistic handling model and will be more on simulation side, unlike its predecessor Test Drive Unlimited 2.

Unlike its two predecessors of both Oahu and Ibiza, the road will be left-hand traffic, a first in the series since The Brotherhood of Speed'''s Tokyo and London. There will be  of drivable roads, as stated on Steam news hub for the game. Creative director Alain Jarniou, who worked on the first two Test Drive Unlimited games, stated in the Nacon Connect 2020 showcase that Test Drive Unlimited Solar Crown has only been in development for "several months" by that time. In April 2021, Nacon published a second teaser trailer that confirmed the game will be released for Microsoft Windows (via Steam and the Epic Games Store), Nintendo Switch, PlayStation 4, PlayStation 5, Xbox One and Xbox Series X/S, with a new trailer to be released in July 2021. The trailer shows an Aston Martin DB11 and a customized Land Rover Range Rover SVR, along with the hands of a male driver and a female driver driving those respective vehicles and gambling in a casino, indicating that the casino feature found in previous Test Drive Unlimited'' games will return. The trailer also shows the key fobs of several vehicles, including those from Audi, Bentley, and Mercedes-Benz, placed in a pot, indicating that players can gamble for vehicles in the game. The game's Steam page was also updated to confirm that Apollo will be among the car makes featured in the game.

On 18 May 2022, Nacon and Kylotonn announced on the game's Steam news hub that the game will be delayed to 2023 and that the PlayStation 4 and Xbox One versions have been cancelled to focus on taking advantage of the more powerful hardware provided by their respective ninth generation successors—the PlayStation 5 and the Xbox Series X and Series S—and improving the quality of the game.

On 1 March 2023, Nacon and Kylotonn announced on the game's Steam news hub the first of several newsletter features. In the newsletter, the developers have teased dealerships and workshop customizations, whilst announcing that a newsletter will be published every month, containing screenshots and exclusive concept art, gameplay details, live game sessions with the developers, and information on the testing phases.

References

External links 

Upcoming video games scheduled for 2023
Nacon games
Cancelled PlayStation 4 games
Cancelled Xbox One games
Driving simulators
Kylotonn games
Multiplayer and single-player video games
Nintendo Switch games
Open-world video games
PlayStation 5 games
Racing simulators
Racing video games
Unlimited Solar Crown
Video games developed in France
Video games featuring protagonists of selectable gender
Video games set in Hong Kong
Windows games
Xbox Series X and Series S games